David Schimel (born 1955) is a Research Scientist at NASA's Jet Propulsion Laboratory. He was formerly Chief Science Officer, Principal Investigator, and CEO for the National Ecological Observatory Network (NEON). Schimel was the convening lead author of the Intergovernmental Panel on Climate Change report, which lead to the IPCC receiving the Nobel Peace Prize in 2007 alongside Al Gore. He has authored numerous papers on biogeochemistry and the global carbon cycle.

Schimel is the director at the Max Planck Institute for Biogeochemistry from 1995 to 2009.

References 

1955 births
Hampshire College alumni
Colorado State University alumni
American Nobel laureates
People associated with renewable energy
Sustainability advocates
Jet Propulsion Laboratory faculty
Living people
Max Planck Institute directors